The Path to God (German: Der Weg zu Gott) is a 1924 German silent film directed by Franz Seitz and starring Agnes Straub and Eduard von Winterstein. It was made by Bavaria Film at the Emelka Studios in Munich.

The film's art direction was by Max Heilbronner. It was shot at the Emelka Studios in Munich.

Cast
In alphabetical order
 Friedrich Basil
 Paul Biensfeldt 
 Wilhelm Diegelmann 
 Olaf Fjord 
 Fritz Kampers 
 Rosa Lang 
 Ferdinand Martini 
 Maria Mindzenty as Mary 
 Heinz Rolf Münz 
 Agnes Straub as Katharine  
 Eduard von Winterstein as Thomas Balt

References

Bibliography
 Grange, William. Cultural Chronicle of the Weimar Republic. Scarecrow Press, 2008.

External links

1924 films
Films of the Weimar Republic
Films directed by Franz Seitz
German silent feature films
Bavaria Film films
German black-and-white films
Films shot at Bavaria Studios